is an arcade racing game developed and published by Namco for the PlayStation 2, and was a launch game for that platform. Focusing on high-speed drift racing in the fictional Ridge City, the game features 7 courses, 15 vehicles and 6 modes of play.

Gameplay

In Ridge Racer V the player is a racing driver taking part in events across Ridge City in a variety of fictional cars. The focus is on accessible and fun driving rather than simulating how a car behaves in the real world; as such the player is encouraged to powerslide around most corners by tapping the brake when entering the turn. Racing on RRV is divided into different race formats. The primary mode is Grand Prix, a series of structured championships completion of which rewards the player with new cars. Other modes include Time Attack, a long distance endurance race called the 99 Trial and free runs on any of the unlocked courses. Two players can also take part in a split-screen race against one another. A special race is unlocked after the player fulfills certain requirements: it features the arcade game characters Pac-Man in a roadster and Blinky, Pinky, Inky and Clyde on scooters. Winning this race unlocks special duel class cars for use in other game modes. Duel class cars can be won by defeating bosses in the game's Duel mode after fulfilling certain requirements. After all 4 bosses are defeated in Duel mode, Battle Royal is unlocked, allow the player to choose any duel class cars and challenge all 4 bosses in a boss rush race (including ones the player have selected).

Development 
Kohta Takahashi served as the sound director and lead composer of Ridge Racer V, who was previously involved as one of the composers of R4: Ridge Racer Type 4. To create an "exciting new experience", he brought in Japanese electronic music duo Boom Boom Satellites, Takeshi Ueda and German DJ Mijk van Dijk, along with Namco composers Nobuyoshi Sano, Yuu Miyake, and Yoshinori Kawamoto, to contribute music to the game. This resulted in the game having a diverse soundtrack, including genres such as trance, death metal and breakbeat. 

Takahashi connected with external artists via Toru Nagamine of Sony Music. Van Dijk felt honored to work on the game, as was already a fan of the Ridge Racer series, as well as the first game's ability to swap the music by replacing the CD in the PlayStation, where he raced to his own music tracks. To ensure that his music fit with the game, he played R4: Ridge Racer Type 4 while composing the tracks in his studio.

Arcade 
Ridge Racer V: Arcade Battle, the arcade port of Ridge Racer V, first appeared in 2001 for the Namco System 246 arcade platform. The arcade version has some features such as Duel, Free Run and Pac-Man GP removed. It was the last Ridge Racer game for arcades until Pachislot Ridge Racer, which was a pachislot game released seven years later (and the last traditional racing game for that market).

Reception

The PS2 version received "generally favorable reviews" according to the review aggregation website Metacritic. Jeff Lundrigan of NextGen, however, said that his quote "bears repeating: 'Like its predecessors, Ridge Racer V will amaze you with flashy graphics and a great sense of speed. Unfortunately, there's not a lot of meat under the basic shell of the game.'" In Japan, Famitsu gave it a score of one nine, one ten, one eight, and one nine for a total of 36 out of 40.

Also in Japan, Game Machine listed the arcade version in their February 1, 2001 issue as the second most-successful dedicated arcade game of the year.

The PlayStation 2 version was a runner-up for "Racing Game of 2000" in both Editors' Choice and Readers' Choice at IGNs Best of 2000 Awards. It was a finalist for the Academy of Interactive Arts & Sciences' 2000 "Console Racing Game of the Year" award, which went to SSX.

References

Notes

Footnotes

Further reading

External links

2000 video games
Arcade video games
Multiplayer and single-player video games
Namco games
Namco arcade games
PlayStation 2 games
Racing video games
Ridge Racer
Sony Interactive Entertainment games
Video games developed in Japan
Video games scored by Yuu Miyake